Masabi Rural District is a rural district (dehestan) in the Central District of Sarayan County, South Khorasan Province, Iran. At the 2006 census, its population was 2,445, in 852 families.  The rural district has 11 villages.

References 

Rural Districts of South Khorasan Province
Sarayan County